John Young Brown (born December 14, 1951) is an American former professional basketball player who played in the National Basketball Association (NBA). A forward, he played college basketball at the University of Missouri. He was a graduate of Dixon High School in Dixon, Missouri.  Brown was selected for the 1972 Olympic team, but due to injury did not compete in the games.

Brown was selected tenth overall in the 1973 NBA draft by the Atlanta Hawks, and was named to the 1974 NBA All-Rookie Team. His final season was split between the Hawks and the Utah Jazz in 1979–80.  Brown also played for the Chicago Bulls for one season and several years in Italy after leaving the NBA.

On March 10, 2019, the University of Missouri retired Brown's number 50 jersey in a ceremony at halftime of their final home game of the 2018–19 season.

References

External links
NBA stats at basketballreference.com

1951 births
Living people
All-American college men's basketball players
American expatriate basketball people in Italy
American men's basketball players
Atlanta Hawks draft picks
Atlanta Hawks players
Basketball players from Missouri
Chicago Bulls players
Missouri Tigers men's basketball players
National Basketball Association players from Germany
German men's basketball players
People from Pulaski County, Missouri
Small forwards
Sportspeople from Frankfurt
Utah Jazz players